The following highways are numbered 957:

United States